The ectotympanic, or tympanicum,  is a bony structure found in all mammals, located on the tympanic part of the temporal bone, which holds the tympanic membrane (eardrum) in place. In catarrhine primates (including humans), it takes a tube-shape.  Its position and attachment to the skull vary between primates, and can be either inside or outside the auditory bulla.

It is homologous with the angular bone of non-mammalian tetrapods.

References

External links
 webref: Anthropology

Skull
Vertebrate anatomy